Somerset Yeomanry may refer to:
North Somerset Yeomanry
West Somerset Yeomanry